Mirzapur is a city in Uttar Pradesh, India, 827 km from Delhi and 733 km from Kolkata, almost 91 km from Prayagraj (formally known as Allahabad) and 61 km from Varanasi. It is known for its carpets and brassware industries, and the folk tradition of kajri and birha music. The city is surrounded by several hills of the Maikal range and is the headquarters of Mirzapur district. It is a famous pilgrimage destination for the holy and sacred shrine of Maa Vindhyavasini (Vidhya Mountains) Vindhyachal, Ashtbhuja, Kali Khoh and Devrahwa Baba Ashram. The district has several waterfalls and natural spots because of its topography.

Geography
It has an average elevation of 80 metres (265 feet).
The District of Mirzapur lies between the parallels of 23.52 & 25.32 North latitude and 82.7 and 83.33 East longitude. It forms a portion of the Varanasi district. On the north and north-east it is bounded by the Varanasi district; on the south bounded by Sonbhadra district; on the north-west by Allahabad district. The shape to the north and west is totally regular. In no direction, except for about 13 km. in the north-east where the Ganges separates the Tehsil of Chunar from the district of Varanasi, has Mirzapur a natural frontier. The Chanvar fields, considered to be one of the most fertile lands tracts in India, are located on Gangetic floodplains of the district. 

Indian Standard Time is calculated on the basis of 82.5° E longitude, from a clock tower in Mirzapur.

According to the Central Statistical Organisation, the district of Mirzapur had an area of 4521km2.

Some geographical locations around Mirzapur district are depicted below.

Demographics

 2011 census, Mirzapur-cum-Vindhyachal municipality had a population of 233,691 and the urban agglomeration had a population of 245,817. The municipality had a sex ratio of 869 females per 1,000 males and 11.9% of the population were under six years old. Effective literacy was 78.25%; male literacy was 83.85% and female literacy was 71.80%.

Politics
A step towards the awareness for voting the District of Mirzapur came with the Guinness World Record for the biggest Rangoli (Alpana) created in an area of 39,125 m2 using approx 120,000 kg of color by across 3500 students and teachers from 50 schools on occasion of National Voters Day. This city is situated at bank of river Ganga.

Commerce
The main business in Mirzapur is carpet manufacturing. Manufacturers range from very small (with less than $100,000 in assets) to medium-sized (with around $10M in assets). Most of the carpets are sold internationally as India has a limited market for carpets. The second main business is of metal pots (brass).

Indian Standard Time calculation
Indian Standard Time is calculated from the clock tower in Mirzapur nearly exactly on the reference longitude of Indian Standard Time at 82°30'E, within 4 angular minutes, a property shared by Tuni, a town in Andhra Pradesh.
This is because there is a time lag of two hours between Gujarat and Arunachal Pradesh. Hence, this was taken as the Standard Meridian for the whole country.

Tourism

For quite some years Mirzapur has been a destination for tourists, particularly for people from adjoining states, owing mainly to the ghats, temples, and the clock tower (Ghanta Ghar) which are excellent examples of contemporary architecture.

Vindhyachal

A few miles away from the city is a site of a pilgrimage for Hindus known as Vindhyachal where according to the mythology a part of Sati (an Avatar of Durga) fell. The river Ganges flows through this city. Other sites of pilgrimage include Kali Khoh (literally 'the cave of the Goddess Kali') where a statue of the Kali has a mouth formed in the shape of a cave, hence the name. Very close to the city is a waterfall. The city itself has many Ghats (steps to a river).

Ghanta Ghar (Clock Tower)
The famous Ghanta Ghar of Mirzapur is located in the premises of city corporation, about 3 km from the Mirzapur Railway Station. Currently not functioning, it was constructed in the year 1891, with its entire structure made up of finely carved stone and a 1000 kg alloy bell hanging from the tall structure.

Ghats

Ojhala Bridge
The Ojhala Bridge was constructed by Mahant Parshuram Giri in Vikram Samvat 1772. This valuable heritage connecting the cities of Mirzapur and Vindhyachal, with fort like minarets and ramparts on the either side of the bridge, provide a fine instance of contemporary architecture.

Pakka Ghat
Another very popular ghat in Mirzapur is Pakka Ghat known for vide variety of shops on both side of staircases descending towards the Ganges. The shops include jewellery, makeup & beauty, clothing and footwear etc.

Education 
Mirzapur benefitted as University known as Rajiv Gandhi South Campus at Barkachha acquired by BHU, on lease in perpetuity from Bharat Mandal Trust in April 1979 with an area of 1104 hectare situated about 8 km South West of Mirzapur City.
At present RGSC (Rajiv Gandhi South Campus) is spread over 2700 acres and has been used to run special courses of Banaras Hindu University. Ambika Devi Senior Secondary School in Panwari Kalan is also located in Mirzapur.

In popular culture
 The web series Mirzapur took the name of the city but is not based on the city life.

See also
Amoi
Kewtaveer
Khulua
Chhitampatti

References

External links

Mirzapur City Official Website
Weather in Mirzapur

 
Cities and towns in Mirzapur district
Cities in Uttar Pradesh